The de Rougé family  whose former name was des Rues is a family of the French nobility from Anjou and dating back to the 14th century.

Some historians believe that the exiting Rougé family from Anjou comes from  a Rougé family known since 1045, ruling over the lordship of Rougé in Brittany, but the link between the des Rues family and the former de Rougé family is not proven.

Several members of this family have distinguished themselves as soldiers, churchmen, diplomats, and academics.

Origins
The  existing des Rues family used the name de Rougé at the beginning of the 16th century after that the older family of the same name de Rougé (known since 1045 became extinct.

The proven filiation of the  existing de Rougé family is established with Huet des Rues, married in 1375 with Jeanne d'Erbrée or with Jean II des Rues, married in 1421 with Jeanne d’Orvaux.

Some historians believe that exiting Rougé family comes from  a Rougé family known since 1045, ruling over the lordship of Rougé in Brittany, but the link between the des Rues family and the former de Rougé family is not proven.

Pierre des Rues, who was confirmed noble in 1667 with proof dating back to 1530, was at the origin of two branches.

Notable family members
Jacques de Rougé du Plessis-Bellière (1602-1654), marquis du Plessis-Bellière, French general, killed in action in Torre Annunziata/Castellammare di Stabia, near Naples in a cavalry charge, 
Pierre François de Rougé (1702-1761), marquis of Rougé, French general, killed in action in the battle of Villinghausen, Germany,
 Gabriel-Louis de Rougé (1729-1772), abbot, vicar-general and bishop of Périgueux (1772).
 Bonabes VI de Rougé (1778-1839), Peer of France in 1815.
 Adrien de Rougé (1782-1838), Peer of France in 1827.

Plessis-Bellière elder branch extinct in 1794 :
 Jacques de Rougé du Plessis-Bellière (1602-1654), French general
 Catherine de Rougé du Plessis-Bellière (1707-1794), duchess of Elbeuf, princess of Lorraine, after her marriage in 1747 with Emmanuel Maurice prince of Lorraine, duke of Elbeuf.
 Gabriel-François de Rougé (1729-1786), French general,
 Gabriel-Louis de Rougé (1729-1772), abbot, vicar-general and bishop of Périgueux (1772),

cadet branch :
 Bonabes Jean Catherine Alexis de Rougé (1751-1783), French colonel who fought in the American Revolutionary War, and died at sea in 1783,
 Alain de Rougé (1871-1936), Member of the Assemblée Nationale,
 Arthur de Rougé (1844-1913), count of Rougé, Spanish duke of Caylus and Grandee of Spain in 1893 (by inheritance of the  family Robert de Lignerac). He had no son and the title of duke of Caylus in Spain to the Dampierre family.
Natalie Victurnienne, Marchioness of Rougé (1759-1828), friend of Queen Marie-Antoinette, 
Bonabes VI Louis Victurnien Alexis de Rougé (1778-1839), marquis de Rougé, Peer of France in 1815,
Adrien de Rougé (1782-1838), comte de Rougé, Member of the Assemblée Nationale, and then Peer of France in 1827,
Emmanuel de Rougé (1811-1872), Egyptologist, Professor at the Collège de France,
Olivier de Rougé, vicomte de Rougé, senator, founder of the cattle breed "Maine-Anjou" (now Rouge des Près),
Bonabes, Count of Rougé (1891-1975), Secretary General of the Red Cross from 1936 to 1957.

Portrait Gallery

Lordships held by the de Rougé family
Les Rues, Le Plessis-Bellière, Chenillé-Changé, La Guerche (Anjou), Moreuil, Villers-aux-Érables, Guyencourt, Faÿ-lès-Nemours, Courtimont, Le Plessis-Courtimont, Roisson, Les Touches, Le Theil-de-Bretagne, Le Teilleul, La Mauvesière, Le Bignon, Sainte Scolace, Vauregnoust, Lorière, Marigné, Le Plessis-Gaudin, La Bellière, Le Bois, La Cour-du-Bois, Maigné, Chigné, Les Mortiers, Dissé, La Courtaillé, La Gauberdière, Les Feuges, Launay, Le Bouays, La Chapelle-Glain, Neuville, La Roche d'Iré, Cinq-Mars-la-Pile, Rouaibile, La Cornouaille, Pontcallec, Gastines, Valençon, Saint-Pierre-Montlimart, La Frébaudière, Langeron, Le May, Montfaucon, Vienne-le-Château, Cholet, Chemillé, Le Tremblay, La Cour de La Raye, Rostrenen, Kerjean, Hervillé, Moyencourt, Hardecourt-aux-bois, La Maison-Rouge, etc.

Castles held by the de Rougé family
Bois-Dauphin à Précigné, Sablé-sur-Sarthe, Moreuil, Guyencourt-sur-Noye, Villers-aux-Érables, Coetmen, in Tréméven, Tonquédec, Baronville, Dinteville, La Maison-Rouge, Mesnil-Voysin, Bonaban, La Bellière, Le Charmel, La Guerche, Roche d'Iré, Courtimont, Faÿ-lès-Nemours, Pontcallec, Tremblay-sur-Mauldre, Rostrenen, Kerjean, Saint-Symphorien-des-Monts, Tressé, Les Essarts, in Vendée, Les Bouysses, in Quercy, etc.

Notable alliances of the des Rues de Rougé family 
d'Erbrée (1375), de Vrigné (1388), d'Orveaux (1421), du Boys (1447), d'Anès (1477), Foureau (1510), du Vieille (1554), de la Cour (1589), Jousseaume (1637), Petiteau (1683), de Chérité (1660), Prezeau de Guilletière (1700), de Coëtmen (1749), de Rochechouart de Mortemart (1777), de Crussol d'Uzès (1804), de Sainte-Maure-Montausier, Cadeau d'Acy, de Colbert-Chabanais, (1880), Martel (1896), de Cardevac d'Havrincourt, de Pastoret, de Francqueville (1842), Niverlet, de Kérouartz, de Forbin d'oppède (1809), de Tramecourt (1828), de Beauffort (1874), Budes de Guébriant (1839), de Nicolaï (1872), Robert de Lignerac de Caylus (1779), de La Porte de Riantz (1808), de Saint-George de Vérac (1833), de Rohan-Chabot (1880), de Ganay, Hutteau d'Origny (1869), Maigne de La Gravière (1872), de Lespinay (1850), Ferron de La Ferronnays (1888), de Charnières (1857), d'Oilliamson, de Malortie, etc.

Titles
 Peer of France (1815 and 1827).
 Marquess Peer (1817 confirmed 1825).
 Baron Peer (1830).
 Duke of Caylus with Grandee of Spain (from 1893 to 1913 for only one member) extinct.

References

Sources 
 Jean-Baptiste Jullien de Courcelles, Histoire généalogique et héraldique des pairs de France, volume 8, page 220.
 Henri Jougla de Morenas, Grand Armorial de France, tome 4 page 74.
 Fernand de Saint-Simon, Dictionnaire de la noblesse française, 1975, page 87
 Borel d'Hauterive, André, Notice historique et généalogique sur la Maison de Rougé, Annuaire de la Noblesse de France, 1880.
 La Barre de Raillicourt, Dominique de, Les Titres authentiques de la noblesse en France, Editions Perrin, 2004.

Marquesses of Rougé
Rouge